The black-eared sparrow-lark (Eremopterix australis) or black-eared finch lark is a species of lark in the family Alaudidae. It is found in southern Botswana, Namibia, and South Africa. Its natural habitats are subtropical or tropical dry shrubland and subtropical or tropical dry lowland grassland.

Taxonomy and systematics
Sometimes the name grey-backed sparrow-lark is used to describe this species, although more commonly it refers to a separate species (Eremopterix verticalis).

References

External links

 Species text in The Atlas of Southern African Birds

black-eared sparrow-lark
Birds of Southern Africa
black-eared sparrow-lark
Taxonomy articles created by Polbot